Playing Between Elephants is a feature-length documentary about humanitarian intervention in the post-tsunami and post-conflict Aceh. This documentary won Human Rights Award at Jakarta International Film Festival 2007.

History of Aceh
Documentary films about the 2004 Indian Ocean earthquake and tsunami
Indonesian documentary films
Films shot in Indonesia